Gojakovići is a toponym that may refer to:

Gojakovići, Kladanj, village in Bosnia and Herzegovina
Gojakovići (Prijepolje), village in Serbia